The YourLife Vitamins LPGA Classic was a golf tournament on the LPGA Tour, played only in 2001. It was played at Grand Cypress Resort in Orlando, Florida. It was the first event of the 2001 season. The winner was Se Ri Pak by four strokes over Penny Hammel and Carin Koch.

References

Former LPGA Tour events
Golf in Orlando, Florida
2001 establishments in Florida
2001 disestablishments in Florida
Women's sports in Florida